Aman Trikha (born 12 December 1986), also known as Aaman Trikha is an Indian playback singer from Mumbai. He has sung songs in Hindi, English, and other languages, and sang "Achhe din aane waale hain", the Loksabha Election 2014 Anthem of the Bharatiya Janata Party.

Early life
Trikha started playing keyboards without any formal training. In 2005, while in the first year of pursuing his Bachelor of Engineering (B.E.) in Electronics & Telecommunication from Thakur College of Engineering and Technology, he discovered that he could sing.

Awards and nominations
2012: Won Man of The Series Award in the Indo-Pak musical reality show Sur Kshetra.
2013: Nominated for Best Upcoming Musical Sensation Male Award in Stardust Awards.
2018: Won the Best Album of the Year Award in 10th Mirchi Music Awards.

Discography

Bollywood Songs

Regional Songs

Web Series / Album Songs / Singles

First Solo Music Video
Aaman Trikha released his first solo Music video Mahiya Tu Hi Tu in 2014 under the music label Crescendo Music / Universal Music.

References

External links
 
 
 Aman Trikha Songs on Spotify
 Aman Trikha Songs, Aaman Trikha Songs on JioSaavn
 Aman Trikha Songs on Gaana

Living people
Punjabi people
Indian male playback singers
Bollywood playback singers
Marathi playback singers
Performers of Hindu music
Musicians from Mumbai
1986 births